Cyperus pennellii is a species of sedge that is native to southern parts of Mexico and northern parts of  South America.

See also 
 List of Cyperus species

References 

pennellii
Plants described in 1944
Flora of Colombia
Flora of Mexico
Flora of Peru